John Sherman (17 October 1788 – 31 August 1861) was an English professional cricketer.  His first-class career spanned a record-equalling 44 seasons from 1809 to 1852 - he shares this record with W G Grace.  He was the elder brother of James Sherman and the uncle of Tom Sherman.

He made 27 known appearances in first-class matches from 1809 to 1852.

Sherman was a right-handed batsman and a right arm slow underarm bowler.  He played his first four matches at the original Lord's Cricket Ground and the next four at its present location.  His career fell into a long hiatus from 1823 but after a gap of 21 years he reappeared for Manchester and took 11 for 50 against Yorkshire.  He played another five first-class matches before his last appearance in 1852.

References

1788 births
1861 deaths
English cricketers
English cricketers of 1787 to 1825
English cricketers of 1826 to 1863
Players cricketers
Surrey cricketers
Manchester Cricket Club cricketers
Epsom cricketers
Non-international England cricketers
St John's Wood cricketers
Lord Frederick Beauclerk's XI cricketers